Omar McLeod (born 25 April 1994) is a Jamaican professional hurdler and sprinter competing in the 60 m hurdles and 110 m hurdles. In the latter event, he is the 2016 Olympic champion and 2017 World champion. He was NCAA indoor champion in the 60 m hurdles in 2014 and 2015 and outdoor champion in the 110 m hurdles in 2015; he turned professional after the 2015 collegiate season, forgoing his two remaining years of collegiate eligibility. His personal best in the 110 m hurdles (12.90 seconds) ranks him equal 7th on the world all-time list.

Early career
McLeod was a promising high school athlete, running for Manchester High School and later Kingston College; during his early career, he competed in both the 110 m and 400 m hurdles. He represented Jamaica at the 2011 World Youth Championships in Lille, qualifying for the finals in both hurdles events; he placed fourth in the 110 m hurdles and eighth in the 400 m hurdles. At the CARIFTA Games, he won gold in the under-20 400 m hurdles for three consecutive years (2011, 2012 and 2013); he scored another five medals in the 110 m hurdles and 4 × 400 m relay including a relay gold in 2013. He also won gold in the relay at the 2012 CAC Junior Championships in San Salvador.

In 2013, his final year in high school, McLeod set Jamaican junior records in both the 110 m (13.24 s) and 400 m hurdles (49.98 s) at the Boys and Girls Championships; he was the first Jamaican high schooler to break 50 s in the latter. After graduating from Kingston College, he went to the University of Arkansas on a track and field scholarship.

Collegiate career
McLeod had no experience running indoors before his move to the United States, but adapted rapidly; he won the 60 m hurdles as a freshman at the 2014 NCAA indoor championships in Albuquerque with a personal best 7.57 s in the heats and 7.58 s in the final. Outdoors, he placed second in the 110 m hurdles at both the Southeastern Conference (SEC) championships and West Regionals, but pulled a hamstring at the NCAA championships and missed the final.

McLeod returned to competition in 2015; he won the SEC indoor title in a personal best 7.49. At the 2015 NCAA indoor championships he repeated as champion, running 7.55 in the heats and 7.45 in the final; his time in the final was a new Jamaican indoor record, broke Reggie Torian's NCAA record from 1997 and tied with Cuba's Orlando Ortega for the world's fastest time that winter. Outdoors, McLeod set a personal best of 13.21 at the Drake Relays and won at both the SEC meet and the West Regionals. He entered the NCAA outdoor championships in Eugene as the favorite; he won, running 13.08 in the heats and 13.01 in the final, but both times were wind-aided. Only two collegiate athlete, Renaldo Nehemiah in 1979, had run faster in any conditions. In addition to his hurdles victory, McLeod ran on the Arkansas relay teams in both the 4 × 100 m relay and the 4 × 400 m relay; Arkansas won the 4 × 100 m in 38.47 and placed sixth in the longer relay.

After the 2015 collegiate season McLeod turned professional and signed an endorsement deal with Nike, forgoing his two remaining years as an NCAA athlete; although he stayed at Arkansas to complete his business studies, he lost his eligibility to represent the Arkansas Razorbacks.

Professional career
McLeod won the 110 m hurdles at the 2015 Jamaican Championships, defeating national record holder Hansle Parchment in a wind-legal 12.97 and breaking 13 seconds for the first time; the time was world-leading for a week. He made his debut as a professional at the István Gyulai Memorial in Székesfehérvár on 7 July, but pulled up with a cramp and failed to finish.

At the start of the 2016 outdoor season, he ran 9.99 seconds for the 100 metres, becoming the first athlete to complete the 110 m hurdles in under 13 seconds and also break the 10-second barrier.

In the 2016 Rio Olympics, he won Gold in the 110m hurdles.

Based on his outstanding athletic performance, Mcleod was recently crowned Jamaica's 2017 Sportsman of the Year. During 2017, he won six of seven 110m hurdles races, including the World Championships in London.

At the 2019 World Championships, McLeod was disqualified in the final for a lane violation, impeding Orlando Ortega. Ortega was second in the 110 metres hurdles until McLeod stumbled into him and arrested his momentum. After the appeal of the Spanish Federation, the IAAF awarded Ortega with a bronze medal.

Statistics
Information from IAAF profile or Track & Field Results Reporting System unless otherwise noted.

Personal bests

Seasonal bests

International championship results

National championship results

Circuit wins
Representing Nike

110 metres hurdles
Diamond League
Doha: 2016
Shanghai: 2016, 2017, 2018, 2019
Eugene: 2016, 2017, 2018
Birmingham: 2019

Notes

References

External links

Omar McLeod on Twitter
Omar McLeod on Instagram

Omar McLeod bio at the Arkansas Razorbacks

Videos
Rio Replay: Men's 110m Hurdles Final by the Olympic Channel via YouTube
Men's 110m Hurdles Final | London 2017 by IAAF via YouTube

1994 births
Living people
Sportspeople from Kingston, Jamaica
Jamaican male hurdlers
Jamaican male sprinters
Arkansas Razorbacks men's track and field athletes
World Athletics Championships athletes for Jamaica
Athletes (track and field) at the 2016 Summer Olympics
Olympic athletes of Jamaica
Olympic gold medalists for Jamaica
Olympic gold medalists in athletics (track and field)
Medalists at the 2016 Summer Olympics
World Athletics Championships medalists
Olympic male hurdlers
World Athletics Championships winners
World Athletics Indoor Championships winners